Trigonopterus halimunensis is a species of flightless weevil in the genus Trigonopterus from Indonesia.

Etymology
The specific name is derived from that of the type locality.

Description
Individuals measure 2.53–3.00 mm in length.  General coloration black, with a rust-colored head, antennae, legs, and part of the elytra.

Range

Phylogeny
T. halimunensis is part of the T. dimorphus species group.

References

halimunensis
Beetles described in 2014
Beetles of Asia
Insects of Indonesia